The Melancholy Collection is a compilation album by Swedish punk rock band Millencolin, released on 29 July 1999 by Burning Heart Records. The album combines the band's first two EPs, B-sides from their singles, and other rare and unreleased tracks. The Melancholy Collection was re-released in the United States by Epitaph Records on 23 October 2001.

Track listing

Personnel
Millencolin
Nikola Sarcevic – lead vocals, bass
Erik Ohlsson – guitar
Mathias Färm – guitar
Fredrik Larzon – drums

Charts

References

External links

The Melancholy Collection at YouTube (streamed copy where licensed)

Millencolin albums
1999 compilation albums
Burning Heart Records compilation albums
Epitaph Records compilation albums